The Washington Pilots were a Negro league baseball team in the East-West League, based in Washington, D.C., in 1932.
Baseball Hall of Famer Mule Suttles played for Washington in 1932. The Pilots would field an independent team in 1934.

References

African-American history of Washington, D.C.
Negro league baseball teams
Defunct baseball teams in Washington, D.C.
Baseball teams disestablished in 1932
Baseball teams established in 1932